Berenjestanak (also Romanized as Berenjestānak; also known as Barenjestānak-e Bālā and Berenjestānak-e Pā’īn) is a village in Sharq va Gharb-e Shirgah Rural District, North Savadkuh County, Mazandaran Province, Iran. At the 2006 census, its population was 281, in 85 families.

References 

Populated places in Savadkuh County